'The West Dixie League was an American professional minor league baseball league that operated for two seasons from 1934 to 1935 as a Class C level league.

History

The West Dixie League was created when the Dixie League divided into the East Dixie League and West Dixie League in 1934. Nine cities were represented in the league; one was in Louisiana, and eight were in Texas. The Jacksonville Jax won both league titles. In 1936, the West Dixie League effectively became the East Texas League.

Cities Represented 
Gladewater, TX: Gladewater Bears 1935 
Henderson, TX: Henderson Oilers 1934–1935 
Jacksonville, TX: Jacksonville Jax 1934–1935 
Longview, TX: Longview Cannibals 1934–1935 
Lufkin, TX: Lufkin Lumbermen 1934 
Palestine, TX: Palestine Pals 1934–1935 
Paris, TX: Paris Pirates 1934 
Shreveport, LA: Shreveport Sports 1935 
Tyler, TX: Tyler Governors 1934; Tyler Trojans 1935

Standings & statistics

1934 West Dixie League
schedule
 Paris (17–45) moved to Lufkin June 27 at the start of the second half. Playoffs: None scheduled.

1935 West Dixie League
schedule
 Shreveport (8–28) moved to Gladewater June 4. Playoffs: Jacksonville 3 games, Palestine 2; Tyler 3 games, Longview 2; Finals: Jacksonville 3 games, Tyler 0, one tie.

References 

 
1934 establishments in Texas
1935 disestablishments in the United States
Defunct minor baseball leagues in the United States
Baseball leagues in Louisiana
Baseball leagues in Texas
Sports leagues established in 1934
1934 establishments in Louisiana